Kannukku Mai Ezhuthu is a 1986 Indian Tamil-language film directed by Mahendran, starring Bhanumathi and Sujatha. It was released on 1 November 1986.

Plot

Cast 
Bhanumathi
Sujatha
Sarath Babu
Vadivukkarasi

Soundtrack 
The music was composed by Ilaiyaraaja.

Release and reception 
Kannukku Mai Ezhuthu was released on 1 November 1986. N. Krishnaswamy of The Indian Express called the film an "exaggeratedly self-indulgent and self-pitying exercise in filmmaking". Jayamanmadhan of Kalki wrote that the camera and music is not bad but Mahendran goes around by which patience is lost.

References

External links 
 

1980s Tamil-language films
1986 films
Films directed by Mahendran (filmmaker)
Films scored by Ilaiyaraaja
Films with screenplays by Mahendran (filmmaker)